Torre de' Busi is a comune (municipality) in the Province of Bergamo in the Italian region Lombardy, located about  northeast of Milan and about  northwest of Bergamo.  
 
Torre de' Busi borders the following municipalities: Calolziocorte, Caprino Bergamasco, Carenno, Cisano Bergamasco, Costa Valle Imagna, Monte Marenzo, Roncola.
The town returned under the Province of Bergamo on January 1, 2018, after 25 years under Lecco Province.

References

External links
 Official website

Cities and towns in Lombardy